The First Council of Cirta was  a synod of bishops called by Secundus of Tigisis, the Primate of Numidia in AD303 or 305.

The Council is known to history for the participation of several "traditores", bishops who had handed over scripture to the Roman authorities during the Diocletian Persecution, and the absolution that Secundus gave them. 

The Council was also significant as Silvanus, a subdeacon, who had also been a traditor, was elected to the bishopric, amid much controversy; this act triggered the Donatist schism in Church History.

See also
 Secundus of Tigisis
 Second Council of Cirta

References

Cirta, 01
Catholic theology and doctrine
300s in the Roman Empire
Donatism
Cirta, 01